Ferreruela de Tábara is a municipality located in the province of Zamora, Castile and León, Spain. According to the 2004 census (INE), the municipality has a population of 596 inhabitants.

Town hall
Ferreruela de Tábara is home to the town hall of 3 towns:
Ferreruela de Tábara (208 inhabitants, INE 2020).
Sesnández de Tábara (145 inhabitants, INE 2020).
Escober de Tábara (93 inhabitants, INE 2020).

References

Municipalities of the Province of Zamora